The United States Army Medical Research and Development Command (USAMRDC) is the United States Army's medical materiel developer, with responsibility for medical research, development, and acquisition and medical logistics management. The USAMRDC's expertise in these critical areas helps establish and maintain the capabilities the U.S. Army needs to fight and win on the battlefield.

Overview
USAMRDC Headquarters at Fort Detrick, Maryland, supports 11 subordinate commands located throughout the world. Six USAMRDC medical research laboratories and institutes perform the core science and technology (S&T) research to develop medical solutions. These laboratories specialize in various areas of biomedical research, including infectious diseases, combat casualty care, operational medicine, clinical and rehabilitative medicine, chemical and biological defense, combat dentistry, and laser effects. The laboratories are staffed with highly qualified scientists and support personnel.

A large extramural research program and numerous cooperative research and development (R&D) agreements provide additional S&T capabilities by the leading R&D organizations in the civilian sector.

Five USAMRDC subordinate commands perform medical materiel advanced development, strategic and operational medical logistics, and contracting, to complete the lifecycle management of medical materiel.

About 6,000 military, civilian, and contractor personnel are assigned to support the Headquarters and subordinate units. Officers, enlisted Soldiers, and civilians-many of whom are among the most respected and knowledgeable specialists in their fields-provide subject matter expertise in medical, scientific, and technical areas throughout the Command.

Medical information and products developed by USAMRDC protect and sustain the health and safety of the force through deployment and combat. The USAMRDC motto, "Protect, Project, Sustain," emphasizes the Command's priorities in support of the warfighter.

History
In March 1994, a merger of Medical Research and Development Command, the United States Army Medical Materiel Agency and the Health Facilities Planning Agency resulted in creation of the Medical Research, Development, Acquisition and Logistics Command (MRDALC), subordinate to the then provisional MEDCOM. The MRDALC was soon renamed the U.S. Army Medical Research and Materiel Command (USAMRMC). Following a restructuring in 2019, the research, development and acquisition elements of USAMRMC were re-designated to Medical Research and Development Command and transferred to Army Futures Command.

MRDC’s subordinate commands 
At Fort Detrick:
U.S. Army Medical Materiel Development Activity (USAMMDA)
U.S. Army Medical Research Acquisition Activity (USAMRAA)
U.S. Army Medical Research Institute of Infectious Diseases (USAMRIID)
Telemedicine and Advanced Technology Research Center (TATRC)

Elsewhere:
United States Army Aeromedical Research Laboratory (USAARL), Fort Rucker, Alabama
United States Army Medical Research Institute of Chemical Defense (USAMRICD), Aberdeen Proving Ground, Maryland
United States Army Research Institute of Environmental Medicine (USARIEM), Natick, Massachusetts
Walter Reed Army Institute of Research (WRAIR), Forest Glen Annex, Forest Glen, Maryland
WRAIR's Special Foreign Activities:
Armed Forces Research Institute of Medical Sciences (AFRIMS), Bangkok, Thailand
United States Army Medical Research Directorate-Africa (USAMRD-A), Nairobi, Kenya
United States Army Medical Research Directorate-Georgia (USAMRD-G), Tbilisi, Georgia
United States Army Medical Research Directorate-West (USAMRD-W), Joint Base Lewis–McChord, Washington
US Army Medical Materiel Center - Europe (USAMMCE), Kaiserslautern Army Depot, Germany
US Army Medical Materiel Center - Korea (USAMMC-K), Camp Carroll, South Korea

Honors and awards
General Maxwell R. Thurman Award

References 

MRMC's 50 Year History Book
MRMC Handbook: version 5 FEB 2019

External links 
 USAMRDC official website

Medical Research And Materiel Command
Medical research
Army, Medical Research And Materiel Command
Fort Detrick
Military units and formations established in 1994